Apoc may refer to:

 African Programme for Onchocerciasis Control, a World Bank and World Health Organization NGO
 Apolipoprotein C, a family of four proteins that resides on lipoproteins.
 Anglo-Persian Oil Company, later BP
 Anarchist People of Color
 APOC (wrestler) is the ring name of a professional wrestler.
 Apoc, a character in the Matrix series
 Assistant production office coordinator, a film and television administrative job